An autonomous university typically refers to a university that exercises independent control over its day-to-day operations and curriculum, as opposed to a university in which the government or a government agency controls the academic programs.

The main dimensions of university autonomy are academic, organizational, financial and staff autonomy.

By country

Singapore 

Singapore has six autonomous universities.

Mexico 

The National Autonomous University of Mexico gained administrative autonomy in 1929. It has control of its own budget and curriculum. It is consistently ranked among the highest universities in Latin America.

See also
 Virtual university
 Private university

References

Types of university or college